Roland Fairbairn McWilliams  (October 10, 1874 – December 10, 1957) was a Canadian politician and office-holder. He served as the 13th Lieutenant Governor of Manitoba from 1940 to 1953.

McWilliams was born in Peterborough, Ontario. He received a Bachelor of Arts degree from the University of Toronto in 1896, and started his Bachelor of Laws degree at Osgoode Hall the following year. He subsequently worked as a barrister and solicitor. He campaigned for the Ontario Liberal Party in the 1905 provincial election, but was defeated.

In 1906, McWilliams was elected Mayor of Peterborough. He moved to Winnipeg, Manitoba in 1910, and continued to practice law for several years.

McWilliams was also a leading organizer within YMCA, serving as its North American Vice President in 1923 and 1924, and as its Canadian leader from 1922 to 1929. He also served as the leader of Winnipeg's Town Planning Institute from 1925 to 1929. He visited Russia in 1926, and later wrote a book on the country's economic system under communism. He does not appear to have sought political office in Manitoba, though his wife Margaret was a respected Winnipeg municipal councillor for several years.

McWilliams was appointed as Manitoba's Lt. Governor on November 1, 1940, and held the position until August 1, 1953. The position was largely ceremonial. A strict temperance follower, McWilliams forbade the serving of alcohol at Government House for the entirely of his time in office. He died at Winnipeg, Manitoba.

McWilliams was also a champion rugby union player in his youth, and won the Dominion title with the University of Toronto Juniors in 1893.

External links 
Manitoba Historical Society Roland Fairbairn McWilliams
Rulers: Canadian Provinces (A-N)
Past Lieutenant Governors of Manitoba, The Honourable Roland Fairburn McWilliams

1874 births
1957 deaths
Lieutenant Governors of Manitoba
Mayors of Peterborough, Ontario
University of Toronto alumni
Canadian rugby union players
YMCA leaders